ESL One Cologne 2017 was a Counter-Strike: Global Offensive tournament run by ESL. In July 2017, sixteen teams from around the globe competed in an offline (LAN) tournament that featured a group stage and playoffs with a 250,000 prize pool. It was the last premier event before the PGL 2017 Krakow Major Championship. In addition, this Cologne event was the first ever Cologne tournament to not host a major as Valve decided to pass over the historic tournament series in favor of the PGL Major.

This tournament was also the first tournament of the Intel Grand Slam, which a list of tournaments run by ESL and DreamHack. The first team to win four titles earns an extra $1,000,000.

Format
ESL invited twelve teams to compete in the tournament. Two teams from Europe, one team from North America, and one team from China competed for the last four spots in three different qualifiers. The group stage was a sixteen team Swiss tournament. The playoffs was an eight team, single elimination best of three bracket, but the grand finals was a best of five.

Map Pool
The event will use Valve's Active Duty map pool.

Broadcast Talent
Host
 Paul "ReDeYe" Chaloner
Desk Host
 Alex "Machine" Richardson
Reporter
 Tres "stunna" Saranthus
Analysts
 Chad "SPUNJ" Burchill
 Adam "friberg" Friberg
 Janko "YNk" Paunović
Commentators
 Anders Blume
 Hugo Byron
 Henry "HenryG" Greer
 Christian "Chrispian" Hart
 Auguste "Semmler" Massonnat
 Jason "moses" O'Toole
 Jack "Jacky" Peters
 Harry "JustHarry" Russell
 Lauren "Pansy" Scott
 Matthew "Sadokist" Trivett
Observers
 Patricia von Halle
 Heather "sapphiRe" Garrozo
 DJ "Prius" Kuntz

Qualifiers
Two teams from Europe, one team from North America, and one team from China will qualify for the tournament.

European Qualifier
8 invited teams, the winner of ESL Meisterschaft, and the qualifiers from the two open qualifiers participated in the closed qualifier.

Teams

North American Qualifier
4 invited teams and 2 teams from the open qualifiers played in the North American qualifier. One team moves on to ESL One Cologne 2017.

Teams

Chinese Qualifier
One team from the China qualifier will advance to the tournament. They will play in a 16 team, single elimination bracket.

Teams

Teams Competing

Group stage
In the first round, teams from pool 1 will be matched up against teams in pool 4. Teams in pool 2 will play teams in pool 3. Each team's pool was determined by the tournament organizers.

In the second round, the winners in the first round will face each other in the "high" matches, in which teams with a 1–0 record will play against each other; the losers will face each other in the "low" matches, in which teams with a 0–1 record will play each other.

In the third round, the winners of the high matches (teams with 2-0 records) from round two will face each other. The winners of these two matches will qualify for the major. The losers of the high round and the winners of the low round (teams with 1-1 records) will face each other in the "mid" matches. The losers from the previous low matches (teams with 0-2 records) will face each other in round three's low matches. The losers of these low matches are eliminated. Twelve teams remain in the Qualifier.

In the fourth round, the losers of the high matches and the winners of the mid matches (teams with 2-1 records) will face each other in round four's high matches. The winners of those high matches qualify for the major. The losers of the mid matches and the winners of the low matches (teams with 1-2 records) will face each other in the low matches of round four. The losers of these matches are eliminated from the Qualifier. Six teams remain.

In the last round, the remaining teams will face off (teams with 2-2 records). The winners of these matches will qualify for the major and the losing teams will be eliminated.

Playoffs

Playoffs Bracket

Quarterfinals

Semifinals

Finals

Final standings
Each team's placing, team roster, coach, and prize distribution are shown below. Each team's in-game leader is shown first.

References

2017 in German sport
2017 first-person shooter tournaments
ESL One Counter-Strike competitions
International esports competitions hosted by Germany
July 2017 sports events in Germany
Sports competitions in Cologne